"Inner City Life" is a song by British electronic musician Goldie featuring vocals by British singer Diane Charlemagne, released in November 1994 as the first single from his acclaimed debut album, Timeless (1995). It is widely considered one of the most iconic drum and bass works of its era, and peaked at No. 39 in the UK. NME ranked it No. 11 in their list of the "50 best songs of 1994". In 2013, it was ranked No. 30 in Mixmags list of "50 Greatest Dance Tracks of All Time".

Background and release

"Inner City Life" is a portion of the album's first track, "Timeless: Inner City Life/Pressure/Jah", which is a 21-minute opus. The song fuses the breakbeats and basslines common in jungle with orchestral textures and soul vocals by Diane Charlemagne. It has been described as a ghetto-blues ballad, 'a yearning reverie of sanctuary from "inner-city pressure"' and features a sample from Ike Turner's song "Funky Mule", from his 1969 album, A Black Man's Soul. Goldie/Metal Heads became the first jungle act to make the Radio One playlist, albeit the N-list, with the track.

"Inner City Life" peaked at No. 49 on the UK Singles Chart in 1994. In 1995, it re-entered the chart, peaking at No. 39. "Inner City Life" was performed live at The Word on Channel 4 and it was included on the soundtrack to the film Trainspotting (Trainspotting 2: Music from the Motion Picture, Vol. 2). At the time of the release, the single didn't receive much radio play, according to Goldie.

Critical reception
Andy Kellman from AllMusic described the song as "emotive". Larry Flick from Billboard viewed it as a "flawless gem". Ben Turner from The Guardian stated, "Inner City Life perhaps said it all – the sound of an intense and explosive urban city under a hot beautiful sunlight. The kind of feeling that something is about to blow. And that was jungle." Dom Phillips from Music & Media noted its "vocal future jungle delights", while Maria Jimenez remarked "the soulful breakbeat", complimenting it as a high quality track of its dance sub-genre. Andy Beevers from Music Week gave it four out of five, stating, "This is the most creative jungle tune yet. Diane Charlemagne's superb vocal soars over the plunging bass, galloping beats and almost ambient synth sweeps. It is a powerful combination that is earning DJ plays from unlikely quarters and deserves to cross over." Rupert Howe from Muzik wrote, "This is a masterpiece of melancholy, with all the dark/light, bass/melody contrasts in jungle thrown into kaleidoscopic relief. The spectral strings move disturbingly in and out of focus, the low frequencies seem to open up underneath you, and the eerie mutations of Diane Charlemagne's vocals float in the ether, utterly lost in space. Emotionally, it's all over the place - joyful one minute, intense enough to suck the daylight out of you the next. Anything to make you feel more alive." Simon Reynolds from The Observer said it "could turn out to be jungle's breakthrough masterpiece". 

Brad Beatnik from the RM Dance Update said, "Perhaps the most talked about record of this month, 'Inner City Life' is actually only a small part of an impressively large picture. [...] The use of the strings and strong female vocals are the defining characteristics on a tune that deserves a standing ovation." Another editor, James Hamilton noted that "Diane Charlemagne calmly wails in jazz samba style through swirling shrill strings and explosively skittering 0-155-0bpm jungle beats, weird and atmospheric". Charles Aaron from Spin commented, "...Goldie has been doing time for a couple of years in London's hardcore techno and jungle scene where insanely speedy breakbeats mixed with goofy vocal snatches run on endless loop. But with "Inner City Life", he inhabits another realm altogether. Like Marvin Gaye ruminating while rushing, he fades a breathtaking vocal by Diane Charlemagne (plus muted trumpet) in and out of ethereal beats. Fraught with dub's tensely apocalyptic vision and techno's hopeful twitch, this is finally the sound of an urban pulse that acknowledges both black and white expressions and tensions, and the feeling of coming up, going down, and needing to keep dancing forever. No other jungle I've heard has sounded like this. Or any other dance music, for that matter." Shane Danielsen from The Sydney Morning Herald noted the "swirling strings" of the track, "underpinned by complex poly-rhythms and booming subsonics."

Music video
The accompanying music video of "Inner City Life" was directed by Mike Lipscombe. It has interchangeable indigo and sepia tone and was later digitally remastered. The video was published on Goldie's official YouTube channel in July 2020.

Impact and legacy
In 1996, British clubbing magazine Mixmag ranked "Inner City Life" No. 34 in its list of the best singles of 1996, "Mixmag End of Year Lists: 1996".

Same year, British drum and bass DJ and producer Fabio chose it as one of his Top 10 tracks, saying, "This track showed the scope of the music and it shocked so many people: before this record people thought drum & bass was good dance music and nothing else. This showed that the music could be as deep as Massive Attack or anything. It's good and bad all wrapped up in one."

In 2010, David Crawford called the track "epic" in his book 10,001 Songs You Must Hear…, adding that it "boasted swirling strings, a clattering break beat that evolved throughout the track, and Diane Charlemagne's sweet, soulful vocals on top."

In 2013, Complex included it in their list of "The 15 Best Songs From the Electronica Era". They noted, "Chock full of soul, precision breakbeat edits, and strings, "Inner City Life" helped let the mainstream know that drum & bass was more than the chin-stroking dark sounds in the corner, and was more than capable of making tracks that could move you emotionally." Same year the song was ranked No. 30 in Mixmags list of "50 Greatest Dance Tracks of All Time".

In 2018, Time Out listed the track at No. 23 in their "50 best '90s songs" list, adding, "Fusing jungle’s intricate breakbeats, sub bass and unbridled futurism with heart-aching soul soundscapes and the lamenting voice of Diane Charlemagne, this beautiful-yet-brutal piece of sonic art switched an entire generation on to the power of jungle and D&B."

Accolades

(*) indicates the list is unordered.

Track listing

 12"-single, Goldie Presents Metalheads – "Inner City Life" (1994)
"Inner City Life"
"Jah"

 12"-single, Goldie Presents Metalheads – "Inner City Life" (Remixes) (1994)
"Inner City Life" (Roni Size Instant Mix)
"Inner City Life" (Nookie Remix)

 Maxi-single, Goldie Presents Metalheads – "Inner City Life" (1994)
"Inner City Life" (Radio Edit) – 3:50
"Inner City Life" (Full-Length) – 7:00
"Inner City Life" (4 Hero Mix Pt. 1) – 8:24
"Inner City Life" (Roni Size Instant Mix) – 5:47

 CD-single, Goldie – "Inner City Life" (1995)
"Inner City Life" (Original Version) – 7:00
"Inner City Life" (Peshay Mix) – 9:41
"Inner City Life" (Doc Scott Mix) – 8:14

 12"-single, Goldie vs. Rabbit in the Moon – "Inner City Life" (The Remixes) (1996)
"Inner City Life" (Rabbit in the Moon's Vocalic City) – 11:20
"Inner City Life" (Rabbit in the Moon's Escape from Vocalic City) – 7:58
"Inner City Life" (Rabbit in the Moon's Return to Vocalic City) – 7:06

 Maxi-single, Goldie – "Inner City Life" (The Remixes) (1996)
"Inner City Life" (Original Edit) – 3:13
"Inner City Life" (Baby Boy's Edit) – 3:34
"Inner City Life" (Rabbit's Short Attention Span Edit) – 4:20
"Inner City Life" (Goes to Miami Mix) – 5:39
"Inner City Life" (4 Hero Mix Pt. 1) – 8:22
"Inner City Life" (Rabbit in the Moon's Vocalic City) – 11:20
"Inner City Life" (Rabbit in the Moon's Escape from Vocalic City) – 7:58
"Inner City Life" (Peshay Mix) – 9:40
"Inner City Life" (Baby Boys) – 6:49
"Inner City Life" (Rabbit in the Moon's Return to Vocalic City) – 7:06

Charts

Cover versions, samples and remixes

 German jazz band [Re:jazz] covered "Inner City Life" on their 2004 album, Point of View.
 English rapper Wiley sampled "Inner City Life" on his song "Need to Be" from the 2008 album, See Clear Now.
 Aaron Jerome and his musical project Sbtrkt sampled the song on the song "Timeless", in 2009.
 It was sampled on "Strictly (Kassem Mosse 'Need to Feel edit' remix)" by Commix in 2010.
 British band Hackney Colliery Band covered "Inner City Life" on their 2013 album, Common Decency.
 British DJ Om Unit sampled "Inner City Life" on his song "Parallel" from the 2014 album, Inversion.
 Goldie remastered the song in 2017.
In 2020 Goldie announced a project on 25 years of project with interviews, archives, re-masters, remixes and re:jazz version.

References

1994 singles
1994 songs
Goldie songs
FFRR Records singles
Music videos directed by Mike Lipscombe